Maple Leaf Publishing was a World War II-era Canadian comic book publisher active during the Golden Age of Comic Books. They were one of four publishers—along with Anglo-American Publishing, Hillborough Studios, and Bell Features—which published "Canadian Whites"—black-and-white comic books with colour covers that proliferated during the war years when American imports were restricted. Maple Leaf Publishing started publishing comic books in March 1941 and went out of business in late 1946.

In contrast to the larger Anglo-American, which published many comics drawn by Canadians but based on imported American scripts, Maple Leaf focused on home-grown scripts. Maple Leaf's first publication, Better Comics #1, is thus considered to be the first true Canadian comic book.

Maple Leaf's comics were modeled on the American format, minus the colour interiors. Notable titles other than Better Comics included Big Bang Comics, Lucky Comics and Rocket Comics.

Titles published 
 Better Comics (34 issues, March 1941 - August/September 1946)
 Bing Bang Comics (31 issues, November–December 1941 - May–June 1946)
 Lucky Comics (34 issues, June 1941 - October–November 1946)
 Name-It Comics (1 issue, Nov./Dec. 1941)
 Rocket Comics (32 issues, 1941–1946)

See also

References

Sources consulted

Notes 

Comic book publishing companies of Canada
Defunct publishing companies of Canada
Golden Age of Comic Books
Publishing companies established in 1941